Prithvi Bahadur Pandé is the chairman of Nepal Investment Bank Limited (NIBL). He is one of the most renowned bankers of Nepal, a pioneer in the commercial banking sector, who took over the French managed Indo-Suez Bank and successfully operated it for more than 15 years. He was an employee of Nepal Rastra Bank
and had worked as director of Rastriya Banijya Bank and Himalayan Bank Limited before leading Nepal Investment Bank in 2001 through foreign investment. On 23rd General Assembly of Nepal Bankers Association(NBA), he was facilitated for making a remarkable contribution for the development of Nepalese banking sector. He is also Chairman of Chhaya Center, which is a multi-stored commercial building located in Thamel, hosting the world-renowned Starwood's Aloft Hotels, a five star hotel in Thamel.

Family 

He was born as third son to diplomat-historian Sardar Bhim Bahadur Pande and Chhaya Devi and is the eighth descendant of Kaji of Gorkha Kingdom, Kalu Pande. He is married to Pratima Rajya Lakshmi Rana, the eldest daughter of the First Governor of Nepal, Himalaya Shumsher Jung Bahadur Rana.

He completed his Chartered Accountancy degree from Delhi in 1978.

References 

Nepalese bankers